Leo Spies (4 June 1899 – 1 May 1965) was a Russian-born German composer and conductor active in the musical and theatrical life of Germany, and especially in Berlin.

Life and career
Spies was born in Moscow to a German diplomat and his wife. He had an older brother Walter Spies, who became an artist and musicologist, and from 1923 lived in Indonesia (then Dutch  who spent most of his career in Bali, and sister Daisy Spies, who became a ballet dancer. He and his siblings were educated in Moscow before the family returned to Germany, where they settled in Dresden.

There Spies trained with Johannes Schreyer and Oskar von Riesemann. He studied at the  under Engelbert Humperdinck and Robert Kahn from 1916 to 1917. 

In his early career Spies worked as a repetiteur in various German theatres and for Universum Film AG. During the late 1920s, he became involved with Hanns Eisler's circle and the workers' choral movement, for which he composed several choral works.

During this period of the divided Germany, the opera was located within East Germany (German Democratic Republic).

His music
Spies was influenced by Russian romanticism and the works of Janáček in his own compositions. He composed in virtually all the classical genres: ballets, concertos, symphonies, chamber music, piano sonatas, lieder, and choral music.

In 1956 Spies was awarded the National Prize of the German Democratic Republic (East Germany). He died in Ahrenshoop shortly before his 65th birthday and is buried in the Dorotheenstadt cemetery.

References

1899 births
1965 deaths
20th-century German conductors (music)
German male conductors (music)
20th-century German composers
20th-century German male musicians
Artists from Moscow
German expatriates in the Russian Empire